Shuaib Oba AbdulRaheem (born October 22, 1948) is former Vice-Chancellor of the University of Ilorin. and former Chairman of the Federal Character Commission (FCC). He did his doctorate from University of Kent.

He is politically associated with the New Nigeria Peoples Party (NNPP) and its gubernatorial candidate for the 2023 Kwara State gubernatorial election in Kwara State, Nigeria. He also contested under the People's Democratic Party  (2011 and 2015), All Progressives Congress (APC) (2019) and Social Democratic Party (SDP). He was also chairman of the Visitation Panels to 25 Federal Polytechnics and 21 Colleges of Education.

References

Nigerian people
1947 births
Living people
Nigerian academics
Nigerian academic stubs
Nigerian politicians